Antti Abram Hyvärinen (21 June 1932 – 13 January 2000) was a Finnish ski jumper and coach. He competed at the 1952 and 1956 Olympics in the normal hill event and finished in seventh and first place, respectively, becoming the first non-Norwegian ski jumper to win an Olympic gold medal. In 1956 he also served as the flag bearer for Finland at the opening ceremony of the Winter Olympics and won the jumping event at the Holmenkollen Ski Festival. While preparing for the 1958 World Championships, Hyvärinen fell and broke his hip, which resulted in an early retirement in November 1957. From 1960 to 1964 he worked as the head coach of the Finnish ski jumping team.

References

External links

 
  – click Vinnere for downloadable pdf file 

1932 births
2000 deaths
People from Rovaniemi
Ski jumpers at the 1952 Winter Olympics
Ski jumpers at the 1956 Winter Olympics
Finnish male ski jumpers
Holmenkollen Ski Festival winners
Olympic ski jumpers of Finland
Olympic gold medalists for Finland
Olympic medalists in ski jumping
Medalists at the 1956 Winter Olympics
Finnish ski jumping coaches
Sportspeople from Lapland (Finland)